The 1884 United States presidential election in Michigan took place on November 4, 1884, as part of the 1884 United States presidential election. Voters chose 13 representatives, or electors, to the Electoral College, who voted for president and vice president.

Michigan was won by the Republican nominee James G. Blaine over Democrat Grover Cleveland in a close race by only 3,308 votes, a margin of less than 1%.

Results

Results by county

See also
 United States presidential elections in Michigan

References

Michigan
1884
1884 Michigan elections